Little Farmer was a weekly American comic strip drawn by Kern Pederson, which was in syndication from 1953 to 1988. The strip featured a short, chubby, moustached farmer, who never spoke, and usually his dog. As with the strips The Little King and Henry, the humor was conveyed via pantomime.

External links
 Little Farmer at Il Piccolo Museo delle Strip Originali

1953 comics debuts
1988 comics endings
American comic strips
Fictional farmers
Pantomime comics